Chaghan Temur (Mongolian:), Courtesy name Tingrui (廷瑞), was a Yuan dynasty officer and military leader of Naiman Kazakh ethnicity.

Life 
Chaghan Temur's family originated from Beshbaliq, today Jimsar County in Xinjiang. His great grandfather migrated to China following the Mongols' invasion. When he was young, Chaghan Temur passed the imperial exam and obtained the degree of Juren.

In the year of 1351, there was an outburst of bandit raids in Chaghan Temur's hometown. Counties nearby were attacked and sacked. Out of self defense, Chaghan Temur organized local militia in Shenqiu to fight off the bandits. The news of a Juren improving public security was heard in the court. In 1352, Chaghan Temur became the darughachi of Runing Fu. He was able to gather as many as 10,000 people under his command at the time.

In 1355, he marched northward. After a series of successful battles, he managed to pacify the chaos of Hebei. The imperial court rewarded him with a civil position. In 1356, he was appointed the Bingbu Shangshu (Minister of war). 

The rest of his life was spent on battlefield. The Yuan dynasty was in utter turbulence. Han Chinese farmers were oppressed under Yuan rule. Riot leader such as Han Shantong and Liu Futong caused the dynasty to strive for survival. Chaghan Temur managed to defeat Liu's force in Henan and consequently rescued Khanbaliq from the starvation resulted by the disruption of transportation of essential food supplies from South to North. Eventually Chaghan Temur was assassinated by Wang Shichen, a surrendered leader of farmer riots, in the year of 1362.

Posthumously, he was granted the title "Prince of Yingchuan" (潁川王) and a posthumous name "Zhongxiang" (忠襄), according to Confucian traditions.

His nephew and step-son Köke Temür was also a general who fought for the failing Yuan dynasty.

Sources 

Yuan dynasty generals
Yuan dynasty politicians